West Down is a small village and civil parish located in North Devon, England. In 2011 its population was 671.

West Down's church is dedicated to Saint Callixtus and its first recorded priest was in 1272. The present church dates from the 14th century, partly rebuilt in 1712. Its Norman font was buried in the churchyard in the Civil War and only rediscovered in the 19th century.  Many of the village's other older buildings date back to the 17th century.

Fullabrook Wind Farm
For many years controversy surrounded the proposed erection of wind turbines at the local Fullabrook Wind Farm. There was opposition on the grounds that the wind farm would spoil the surrounding landscape and thereby disrupt tourism on which the local economy depends. However, in 2007 the proposals to build 22 wind turbines were given the go-ahead, to become fully operational in 2010.

References

External links

 http://www.westdown.org.uk/
 https://www.westdownparishcouncil.org.uk

Civil parishes in Devon
Villages in Devon